The 2nd Ohio Infantry Regiment was an infantry regiment in the Union Army during the American Civil War.

Three-months regiment
With the outbreak of the Civil War in the spring of 1861, President Abraham Lincoln called for volunteers from each Northern state. In April, recruiters quickly filled the quota for a number of regiments in the state of Ohio, with two regiments enlisting for 3-months, including the 1st Ohio Infantry Regiment and the 2nd Ohio Infantry Regiment. Mustering in at Columbus, Ohio, on April 18, 1861, the 1,000-man regiment was under the command of Colonel Lewis Wilson. It soon embarked on trains for Washington, D.C., where it served in the fortifications surrounding the capital until July. It was then attached to Schenck's Brigade, Tyler's Division, McDowell's Army of Northeastern Virginia. On July 16, the regiment marched to Manassas, Virginia, then the next day occupied Fairfax Courthouse. It participated in the fighting at the First Battle of Bull Run on July 21. It retreated to Washington following General McDowell's stunning defeat. When the 3-month term of enlistment expired, the regiment mustered out July 31, 1861.

Three-years regiment
After the term of service was over in August, a number of the men re-enlisted for 3-years in the reconstituted 2nd Ohio Infantry, under the command of Colonel Leonard A. Harris in the brigade of William "Bull" Nelson. The new 2nd Ohio was organized at Camp Dennison in Cincinnati from July 17 to September 20, 1861. The regiment left Ohio for service in Kentucky on September 4, operating near Olympian Springs, Kentucky, until November. It first "saw the elephant" (initial combat experience) in a skirmish at West Liberty, Kentucky, on October 23. The regiment was attached to 9th Brigade, Army of the Ohio from October until December. It served in a number of posts in Kentucky, including Louisville, through February 1862, when it was part of the army's advance on Confederate-held Bowling Green and Nashville. After briefly occupying Nashville, the regiment advanced to Murfreesboro, Tennessee, in March under Ormsby Mitchel. Five men from the regiment participated in the Great Locomotive Chase, with three being executed as spies. The regiment played a role in assaulting Confederates near Huntsville and Bridgeport in Alabama in April.

After guarding the Memphis and Charleston Railroad much of the summer, the 2nd Ohio marched back to Louisville in August and September in pursuit of the Confederate army of Braxton Bragg, eventually fighting at the Battle of Perryville on October 8 before returning to Nashville for most of the rest of the year. The regiment, reassigned to the 1st Brigade, 1st Division, XIV Corps, Army of the Cumberland, saw more hard action at the Battle of Stones River in late December and early January. There, the regiment captured the flag of the 30th Arkansas Infantry, but lost Colonel John Kell and nine other men. Anson G. McCook (of the famed "Fighting McCooks") replaced Kell and led the regiment for the remainder of the war.

The regiment remained in Murfreesboro until June when it participated in the Tullahoma Campaign, fighting at the Battle of Hoover's Gap. In the early autumn, it participated in the Chickamauga Campaign and the subsequent Battle of Chattanooga. Chickamauga in particular was hard on the regiment, with 183 soldiers killed, wounded, or captured, and 36 men who were taken as prisoners of war later died in the infamous Andersonville prison camp.

As Ulysses S. Grant's army pursued the retiring Confederates into Georgia in late November through May 1864, the regiment saw action at a number of small battles, including Ringgold, Dalton, Tunnel Hill, Buzzard's Roost Gap and Rocky Faced Ridge. It served in the successful Atlanta Campaign in May, including more hard fighting at the Battle of Resaca and the fighting at Pickett's Mills, Kennesaw Mountain, and Peachtree Creek. It remained in the siege lines around Atlanta until August 1, when the much depleted regiment was ordered to the rear at Chattanooga as the term of enlistment neared expiration.

The 2nd Ohio mustered out of the Union army in Columbus on October 10, 1864. Only 350 men were still on the active roster, although less than 150 were actually in the ranks when the regiment left Georgia. A number of the healthy men re-enlisted and were transferred to 18th Ohio Infantry. Colonel McCook stayed in the army as a brigade commander, ending the war with the rank of brigadier general.

Casualties
The regiment lost a total of 243 men during service; 9 officers and 96 enlisted men killed or mortally wounded, 138 enlisted men died of disease.

Notable members
Four men from the regiment received the Medal of Honor for their actions during the Civil War:

 Corporal William Pittenger, Company G - (Andrews Raid)
 Sergeant Major Marion A. Ross - (Andrews Raid)
 Private James (Ovid Wellford) Smith, Company I - (Andrews Raid)
 Private William Surles, Company G - (Battle of Perryville: "In the hottest part of the fire he stepped in front of his colonel to shield him from the enemy's fire.")

See also
 List of Ohio Civil War units
 Ohio in the Civil War

Notes

References

External links
 Ohio in the Civil War: 2nd OVI by Larry Stevens
 National flag of the 2nd Ohio Infantry, probably early war
 National flag of the 2nd Ohio Infantry, probably later issue
 Regimental flag of the 2nd Ohio Infantry
Civil War Index: 2nd Ohio Infantry - 3 Months Service in the American Civil War
Civil War Index: 2nd Ohio Infantry - 3 Years Service in the American Civil War

Military units and formations established in 1861
Units and formations of the Union Army from Ohio
1861 establishments in Ohio
Military units and formations disestablished in 1864
1864 disestablishments in Ohio